The 1990 Full Members' Cup final, also known by its sponsored name, the Zenith Data Systems Cup, was a football match which took place at Wembley Stadium on 25 March 1990. It was contested between First Division Chelsea and Second Division Middlesbrough. Chelsea's Tony Dorigo scored the only goal of the match with a long-range free kick.

Match details

References

Full Members' Cup Final 1990
Full Members' Cup Final 1990
1990
1989–90 in English football
March 1990 sports events in the United Kingdom
1990 sports events in London